The Naked Woman: A Study of the Female Body is a book by zoologist Desmond Morris first published in 2004.

The book describes the female body from an evolutionary point of view. It is divided in several chapters, each dedicated to a part of the body, from hair to foot. For each, Morris explains the structure and function of the part, discusses its evolution, the social importance throughout human history, and the artificial modifications and decorations employed by different cultures.

After a chapter on evolution, the following 22 chapters are dedicated respectively to: hair, brow, ears, eyes, nose, cheeks, lips, mouth, neck, shoulders, arms, hands, breasts, waist, hips, belly, back, pubic hair, genitals, buttocks, legs, and feet.

External links
'The Naked Woman': Highly Intelligent Design
High voices and plump lips
Breasts, bottoms and so forth

2004 books
Books by Desmond Morris